Maureen Louise Arthur (April 15, 1934 – June 15, 2022) was an American film, television, and stage actress.

Life and career
Arthur appeared in numerous movies and television programs from the late 1950s through the early 1990s as well as on Broadway. On television, she appeared in Bourbon Street Beat, The Red Skelton Hour, Perry Mason, Branded, I Spy, The Monkees, The Flying Nun, Gomer Pyle, U.S.M.C., Love, American Style, The New Dick Van Dyke Show, Kolchak: The Night Stalker, Sanford and Son, Alice, Laverne & Shirley, Mork & Mindy, Murder, She Wrote, The Red Hand Gang as child-kidnapper Lola, and Matlock. Get Smart (Contessa) 

In 1967, in arguably her most prominent single movie role, she portrayed Hedy La Rue in the film version of the Broadway hit How to Succeed in Business Without Really Trying. In 1969, she co-starred with Don Knotts in the screwball comedy The Love God?, and with Bob Hope, Jackie Gleason and Jane Wyman in the romantic comedy How to Commit Marriage.

In the mid-1960s, she recorded a pop tune on the Carlton record label titled "Don't Make the Angels Cry" and "What Does He Do with Her". Another single titled "Don't Leave Me" was unreleased, though an acetate recording exists. In New York, she studied singing and also studied drama with Wynn Handman of the Neighborhood Playhouse. She made frequent appearances on The Steve Allen Show and on The Ed Sullivan Show before moving on to play the Rivera Hotel in Las Vegas with the Latin Quarter Review. She traveled to Los Angeles to star in movies, beginning with Hot Rod Gang, Thunder Alley and Killers Three.

While in Los Angeles, she auditioned for the national cast of How to Succeed in Business Without Really Trying and landed the part of Hedy La Rue. She toured across the U.S. for two years and was in the Broadway production for one year before returning to Los Angeles for another audition, this time for the movie. After several more movies, she headed back to Broadway for Something Different, a play written and directed by Carl Reiner, and starring Bob Dishy and Linda Lavin. When that play closed, she returned to Los Angeles to marry producer/creator Aaron Ruben. Her performance as Miss Adelaide in the Los Angeles Civic Light Opera revival of Guys and Dolls brought her a Drama Critics' Best Performance Award.

Personal life
Arthur was married to musician George William Weidler from 1957 to 1970 when they divorced. She then was married to producer Aaron Ruben from October 30, 1971 until his death on January 30, 2010. Arthur died on June 15, 2022, in her home in Beverly Hills, California, at the age of 88 from natural causes after a long bout with Alzheimer’s disease.

Affiliations
Arthur performed at the Variety of Iowa Telethons yearly for over 25 years and was a member of the Iowa Chapter of Variety. Her longtime association with Variety earned her the title of "First Lady of Variety Clubs Telethons", and then she earned the official title of International Ambassador. She was a longtime president of Variety, the Children's Charity of Southern California, Tent 25.

Filmography

References

External links
 
 
 

1934 births
2022 deaths
Actresses from San Jose, California
American film actresses
American stage actresses
American musical theatre actresses
American television actresses
American women singers
Musicians from San Jose, California
Singers from California